Jeff Lang (born 9 November 1969) is an Australian guitarist, songwriter, vocalist and music producer. Lang plays various types of guitar, both slide and standard, as well as banjo, mandolin, cümbüş and drums.

He is a three-time ARIA Award winner, for his albums Rolling Through This World (2002), Djan Djan (2010) and Carried in Mind (2012). Lang has performed at festivals all across the world including The Dublin Blues Festival, Philadelphia Folk Festival, Quebec City Music Festival, Falcon Ridge Folk Festival, Winterhawk Bluegrass Festival, Fuji Rock, Glastonbury, Echo Park China, Ottawa BluesFest as well as in Australia at Port Fairy, Woodford, Bluesfest Byron Bay and Womadelaide.

Lang approaches record deals on a record-by-record basis saying "I still own all my records. The early albums, like Cedar Grove, still come out through an independent distribution deal" and he picks his own musicians and how he wishes each record to sound.

Career

1969–1993: Early Years and The Jeff Lang Band
Jeff Lang became interested in music at age eight, when he started playing the clarinet. His early influences were AC/DC, Bob Dylan, Leo Kottke, Ry Cooder, Roy Buchanan and Neil Young. As a teen, Lang began to learn guitar and commenced performing as a blues guitarist at 17, supporting artists like Albert Collins, Rory Gallagher and Trudy Lynn. His musical vocabulary expanded to include traditional Celtic and folk elements as he began recording his own material in 1990. Along with gigs in local blues bands, Lang formed The Jeff Lang Band as a showcase for his songwriting skills. The band disbanded in 1993 and concentrated on playing solo shows. Lang said the band disbandment was a "purely instinctive decision" and one he's never looked back from.

1994–2003: Career beginnings
In 1994, Lang self-released his debut studio album titled, Ravenswood, which was followed by a live recording titled Disturbed Folk in 1995.

In 1996, Lang released Native Dog Creek on Black Market Music. The album was named Best Australian Blues Album in Rhythms Magazine's readers poll.

In 1998, Lang released his third studio album titled, Cedar Grove, which was nominated for ARIA Award for Best Blues and Roots Album at the ARIA Music Awards of 1999. In 1999, Lang released a limited edition album titled, The Silverbacks with Hat Fritz.

In 2001, Lang released Everything Is Still with Angus Diggs. The album was again nominated for ARIA Award for Best Blues and Roots Album at the ARIA Music Awards of 2001. In 2002, Lang join Bob Brozman and collaborated again with Diggs on the album Rolling Through This World. At the ARIA Music Awards of 2002, the album, won the ARIA Award for Best Blues and Roots Album, Lang's first win.

2004–2018: ARIA and APRA Awards
In July 2004, Lang released his seventh studio album Whatever Makes You Happy, his first on ABC Music. The album, became his first album to reach the ARIA top 100, peaking at number 91.

In 2005, Lang released You Have to Dig Deep to Bury Daddy on ABC Classics. Lang said "There are a couple of instrumental things on this album that were actually recorded some years ago. They were in the background for possible inclusion on other albums. Specifically, tracks like 'And All the Snow Melted' and 'I'm Not the One Sweating Like They Just Told Me a Lie'.. had a darker mood. They didn't seem to fit on the last record. So what I did this time around was, I put them on the table first. I wanted to use these instrumental pieces. So I started with them and recorded stuff with that in mind."

In August 2006, Lang collaborated with Chris Whitley and released Dislocation Blues. The album peaked at number 64 on the ARIA Charts. Half Seas Over was released in 2008 and Chimeradour in 2009. All three albums were released on ABC Roots and all nominated for ARIA Awards. Chris Whitley passed away in November of 2005.

In 2009, Lang collaborated with Mamadou Diabate and Bobby Singh on the album Djan Djan. The album which was released in 2010. At the ARIA Music Awards of 2010, the album won ARIA Award for Best World Music Album.

In 2011, Lang released Carried in Mind.

In 2012, Lang was presented with the National Film and Sound Archive of Australia's National Folk Recording Award.
 Also in 2012, Lang added vocals to Maru Tarang's album Blue City.

In May 2014, Lang released the soundtrack to the TV series The Gods of Wheat Street. This won Lang his first APRA Award at the APRA Music Awards of 2014, where he won Best Television Theme.

2019–present: Some Memories Never Die
In 2019, Lang released Next They Come for You, on LP. The album is an instrumental recording featuring Lang and his regular drummer Danny McKenna playing music they wrote together without restrictions, constraints.

In 2020, Lang released the book Some Memories Never Die. Lang said "For Some Memories Never Die I wanted to connect recollections from the life I've lived to some of the songs I've made up along the way. I wasn't looking to write a linear autobiography, with my life's journey laid out in order of occurrence, more a series of stand-alone vignettes was what I had in mind. I wasn't sure exactly how a good many of these tales could be connected to the songs I intended to include, as I don't generally write autobiographical songs. But as I wrote down the varied reminiscences, certain stories seemed to go together and themes became apparent to me. Gradually it all seemed to find its form, and Some Memories Never Die is the end result."

Discography

Studio albums
{| class="wikitable plainrowheaders" style="text-align:center;" border="1"
! scope="col" rowspan="2" style="width:11em;"| Title
! scope="col" rowspan="2" style="width:17em;"| Details
! scope="col" colspan="1" | Peak chart positions
|-
! scope="col" style="width:3em;font-size:90%;" | AUS
|-
! scope="row"| Ravenswood
|
 Released: 1994
 Label: Jeff Lang (JL941 CD)
 Format: CD
| —
|-
! scope="row"| Native Dog Creek
|
 Released: 1996
 Label: Black Market Music (BMM 206.2)
 Format: CD
| —
|-
! scope="row"| Cedar Grove
|
 Released: 1998
 Label: Jeff Lang (JL9801CD)
 Format: CD
| —
|-
! scope="row"| The Silverbacks 
|
 Released: 1999
 Label: Jeff Lang (JL9801CD)
 Format: CD (Limited to 500 copies)
| —
|-
! scope="row"| Everything Is Still 
|
 Released: 2001
 Label: Jeff Lang (JLCD2001)
 Format: CD
| —
|-
! scope="row"| Rolling Through This World 
|
 Released: 2002
 Label: Jeff Lang (JLCD2002)
 Format: CD
| —
|-
! scope="row"| Whatever Makes You Happy 
|
 Released: July 2004
 Label: Jeff Lang, ABC Classics (13930 /13932)
 Format: CD, digital download
| 91
|-
! scope="row"| You Have to Dig Deep to Bury Daddy 
|
 Released: 2005
 Label: Jeff Lang, ABC Classics / Warner (14500)
 Format: CD, digital download
| —
|-
! scope="row"| Dislocation Blues  
|
 Released: August 2006
 Label: Jeff Lang, ABC Roots (11777790)
 Format: CD, digital download
| 64
|-
! scope="row"| Half Seas Over 
|
 Released: August 2008
 Label: Jeff Lang, ABC Roots (1777791)
 Format: CD, digital download
| —
|-
! scope="row"| The Blessed South (Songs by Melbourne Songwriters)' 
|
 Released: 2008
 Label: 
 Format: CD, digital download
| —
|-
! scope="row"| Chimeradour 
|
 Released: 2009
 Label: ABC Roots (2717429)
 Format: CD, digital download
| —
|-
! scope="row"| Djan Djan 
|
 Released: March 2010
 Label: ABC Roots / Universal (2723504)
 Format: CD, digital download
| —
|-
! scope="row"| Carried in Mind 
|
 Released: September 2011
 Label: Jeff Lang, ABC Music (2780478)
 Format: CD, 2xCD, digital download
| —
|-
! scope="row"| I Live in My Head a Lot These Days 
|
 Released: 16 May 2014
 Label: Jeff Lang, ABC Music (3765640)
 Format: CD, digital download
| —
|-
! scope="row"| Alone in Bad Company 
|
 Released: February 2017
 Label: Jeff Lang, ABC Music (5730477)
 Format: CD, digital download, streaming
| —
|-
! scope="row"| Next They Come for You 
|
 Released: 2019
 Label: Fury Records 
 Format: LP
| —
|-
|}

Soundtracks

Live albums

Compilation albums

Awards and nominations
AIR Awards
The Australian Independent Record Awards (commonly known informally as AIR Awards) is an annual awards night to recognise, promote and celebrate the success of Australia's Independent Music sector. They commenced in 2006

|-
| AIR Awards of 2010
|Chimeradour 
| Best Independent Blues and Roots Album
| 
|-

APRA Awards
The APRA Awards are presented annually from 1982 by the Australasian Performing Right Association (APRA), "honouring composers and songwriters". Lang has been nominated for one award.

|-
| 2014 || "The Gods of Wheat Street" || Best Television Theme || 

ARIA Music Awards
The ARIA Music Awards is an annual awards ceremony that recognises excellence, innovation, and achievement across all genres of Australian music. Lang has won 3 awards from 10 nominations.

|-
| 1999
| Cedar Grove| Best Blues and Roots Album
| 
|-
| 2001
| Everything Is Still 
| Best Blues and Roots Album
| 
|-
| 2002
| Rolling Through This World 
| Best Blues and Roots Album
| 
|-
| 2004
| Whatever Makes You Happy| Best Blues and Roots Album
| 
|-
| 2005
| You Have to Dig Deep to Bury Daddy| Best Blues and Roots Album
| 
|-
| 2007
| Dislocation Blues 
| Best Blues and Roots Album
| 
|-
| 2008
| Half Seas Over| Best Blues and Roots Album
| 
|-
| rowspan="2"| 2010
| Djan Djan 
| Best World Music Album
| 
|-
| Chimeradour| Best Blues and Roots Album
| 
|-
| 2012
| Carried in Mind''
| Best Blues and Roots Album
| 
|-

Equipment

Lang primarily plays acoustic guitars, although he has an unorthodox way of amplifying them, running a combination of a built-in microphone and a Sunrise magnetic pick-up together for his clean acoustic sound, while also running the output of the Sunrise pick-up through various effects through an electric guitar amplifier allowing him to obtain both acoustic and distorted electric guitar tones from the same guitar. This approach has been hugely influential in the Australian scene, particularly after the well-known guitarist John Butler was inspired by Lang's playing and sound to pursue a very similar setup.

References

External links
Jeff Lang's Facebook page
Jeff Lang's website

1969 births
ARIA Award winners
Slide guitarists
Australian blues guitarists
Australian male guitarists
Australian rock guitarists
Australian singer-songwriters
Living people
Weissenborn players
Chain (band) members
Australian male singer-songwriters
Musicians from Geelong
Australian banjoists
Australian mandolinists